The  Conference on Jewish Social Studies was established in 1933 as the Conference on Jewish Relations by Salo W. Baron and Morris Raphael Cohen.  Baron was chairman from 1933 till 1988.  The immediate issue was facing rapidly spreading Nazi world propaganda with its fabrications and falsehoods. In addition, it aimed to get a fuller picture about Jewish population, economics, and various aspects of Jewish life. 

In 1936, Albert Einstein presided over the conference.

Among the sponsored projects by the conference was the quarterly journal Jewish Social Studies, which began being published regularly from January 1939.

In 1955 the conference obtained its present title. It was active till 1988. Its journal continues and is currently published by Indiana University Press.)

References

Organizations established in 1933
1933 establishments in the United States
Jewish organizations based in the United States
1988 disestablishments in the United States
Jewish organizations established in 1933
Sociology of Jewry